The canton of Le Saulnois is an administrative division of the Moselle department, northeastern France. Its borders were modified at the French canton reorganisation which came into effect in March 2015. Its seat is in Château-Salins.

It consists of the following communes:
 
Aboncourt-sur-Seille 
Achain
Ajoncourt
Alaincourt-la-Côte
Albestroff
Amelécourt
Attilloncourt
Aulnois-sur-Seille
Bacourt
Bassing
Baudrecourt
Bellange
Bénestroff
Bermering
Bezange-la-Petite
Bidestroff
Bioncourt
Blanche-Église
Bourgaltroff
Bourdonnay
Bréhain
Burlioncourt
Chambrey
Château-Bréhain
Château-Salins
Château-Voué
Chenois
Chicourt
Conthil
Craincourt
Cutting
Dalhain  
Delme
Dieuze
Domnom-lès-Dieuze
Donjeux
Donnelay
Fonteny
Fossieux
Foville
Francaltroff
Frémery
Fresnes-en-Saulnois
Gelucourt
Gerbécourt
Givrycourt
Grémecey
Guébestroff
Guéblange-lès-Dieuze
Guébling
Guinzeling
Haboudange
Hampont
Hannocourt
Haraucourt-sur-Seille
Honskirch
Insming
Insviller
Jallaucourt
Juvelize
Juville
Lagarde
Laneuveville-en-Saulnois
Lemoncourt
Léning
Lesse
Ley
Lezey
Lidrezing
Lindre-Basse
Lindre-Haute
Liocourt
Lhor
Lostroff
Loudrefing
Lubécourt
Lucy
Maizières-lès-Vic
Malaucourt-sur-Seille
Manhoué
Marimont-lès-Bénestroff
Marsal
Marthille
Molring
Moncheux
Moncourt
Montdidier
Morville-lès-Vic
Morville-sur-Nied
Moyenvic
Mulcey
Munster
Nébing
Neufvillage
Obreck
Ommeray
Oriocourt
Oron
Pettoncourt
Pévange
Prévocourt
Puttigny
Puzieux
Réning
Riche
Rodalbe
Rorbach-lès-Dieuze
Sailly-Achâtel
Saint-Epvre
Saint-Jure
Saint-Médard
Salonnes
Secourt
Sotzeling
Tarquimpol
Tincry
Torcheville
Vahl-lès-Bénestroff
Val-de-Bride
Vannecourt
Vaxy
Vergaville
Vibersviller
Vic-sur-Seille 
Vigny
Villers-sur-Nied
Virming
Vittersbourg
Viviers
Vulmont
Wuisse
Xanrey
Xocourt
Zarbeling
Zommange

References

Cantons of Moselle (department)